HMS Ambush is an Astute-class nuclear-powered attack submarine of the Royal Navy, the second boat of her class.

Ambush is the third vessel, and the second submarine, to bear the name in Royal Naval service. She was ordered in 1997, laid down in 2003 and commissioned in 2013.

Design

Propulsion
Ambush'''s nuclear reactor will not need to be refuelled during the boat's 25-year service. Since the submarine can purify water and air, she will be able to circumnavigate the planet without resurfacing. The main limit is that the submarine will only be able to carry three months' supply of food for 98 officers and ratings.

WeaponsAmbush has provision for up-to 38 weapons in six  torpedo tubes.

Construction and commissioningAmbush was ordered from GEC's Marconi Marine (now BAE Systems Submarine Solutions) on 17 March 1997. She was laid down at Barrow-in-Furness on 22 October 2003, officially named on 16 December 2010, launched on 6 January 2011, completed her initial dive test on 30 September 2011, and departed Barrow for sea trials on 15 September 2012. Ambush was commissioned in a ceremony at HM Naval Base Clyde on 1 March 2013.

Operational history
Following her commissioning, Ambush continued sea trials throughout much of 2013. In May 2013, she carried out berthing trials with forward support ship  and, in August 2013, she successfully conducted her first live torpedo and cruise missile firings.

In October 2014, Ambush completed a maiden deployment to the United States, visiting Brazil's Port Canaveral along the way and taking part in its submarine force's centenary celebrations. In April 2015, Ambush participated in Exercise Joint Warrior, the largest military exercise held in Europe, alongside 55 other naval ships of NATO navies. She further participated in Exercise Dynamic Manta 15.

Collision
On 20 July 2016, while surfacing on an exercise in the Strait of Gibraltar, Ambush collided with the Panama-flagged merchant ship , sustaining significant damage to the top of her conning tower where some of her sonar equipment is housed. It was reported that no crew members were injured during the collision and that the submarine's nuclear reactor section remained completely undamaged. Repairs cost £2.1 million and the commander, who was training a group of students at the time, was sentenced to forfeiting a year of seniority for negligently hazarding the vessel.

AffiliationsAmbush is affiliated to:
 The city of Derby
 The Dolphin ward of Royal Derby Hospital
 Bemrose School Derby
 The Sea Cadet unit TS  Kenya''
 Rolls-Royce Marine Division, Derby
 Royal Naval Association, Derby Submariners' Association, Derby branch
 National Memorial Arboretum

References

External links
Royal Navy HMS Ambush (royalnavy.mod.uk)

Astute-class submarines
Ships built in Barrow-in-Furness
2011 ships
Submarines of the United Kingdom
Non-combat naval accidents
British submarine accidents